David Black was a footballer who played at centre-forward.

Career
Black played for Blackburn Rovers, before joining Burslem Port Vale in October 1895. On 19 October, he made his debut in a heavy 8–2 defeat to Darwen. He scored his first goal for the club two days later, in a 5–4 victory over Liverpool at the Athletic Ground. However, after seven Second Division and two FA Cup appearances the club declared him to be "a stone too heavy" and so he left by mutual consent in January 1896 and headed for Scotland.

Career statistics
Source:

References

Year of birth missing
Year of death missing
English footballers
Association football forwards
Blackburn Rovers F.C. players
Port Vale F.C. players
English Football League players